The Ugly Truth is a 2009 romantic comedy film.

The Ugly Truth may also refer to:

 Diary of a Wimpy Kid: The Ugly Truth, the fifth book in the Diary of a Wimpy Kid series

In music:
 The Ugly Truth, an album by Louis Tillett and Charlie Owen
 The Ugly Truth (album), an album by Prolyphic and Reanimator
 "The Ugly Truth", a song by Earshot
 "The Ugly Truth", a song by Nick Jonas from UglyDolls
 "The Ugly Truth", a song by Matthew Sweet from Altered Beast
 "Ugly Truth", a song by Soundgarden from Louder Than Love

In television:
 "The Ugly Truth" (Becker), an episode of Becker
 "The Ugly Truth" (Farscape), an episode of Farscape
 "The Ugly Truth", an episode of The Jamie Foxx Show